Gable Island is an Argentine island part of Tierra del Fuego Province. The island has an irregular shape with many shoal banks extending into bays and open channel. The islands surface is mostly covered by Magallanic forest. Drumlins from the last ice age dominate topography which has allowed the formation of several small lagoons on the island.

References 

Atlantic islands of Argentina
Landforms of Tierra del Fuego Province, Argentina
Islands of Tierra del Fuego